Antón   is a corregimiento in Antón District, Coclé Province, Panama. It is located near the north-western shore of the Gulf of Panama. It is the seat of Antón District. Its population as of 1990 was 7,220; its population as of 2000 was 8,360.

References

Corregimientos of Coclé Province